The O'Byrne family is an Irish clann that descend from Bran mac Máelmórda, King of Leinster, of the Uí Faelain of the Uí Dúnlainge. Before the Norman invasion of Ireland they began to colonise south Wicklow.
There are many famous people with this Irish last name. This includes Anna O’Byrne, an Australian singer and actress, and Anna Marie O’Byrne, an American model.

History
The seat of the most famous branch of the Ó Broin (Uí Broin or Branaigh) was at Ballinacor and controlled the surrounding lands, part of Críoch Branach.

During the Desmond Rebellions, the warlord Hugh O'Byrne gave support to the Earl of Desmond, and died during the second rebellion. His son Fiach McHugh O'Byrne took over the chieftainship and together with the Pale lord James Eustace, 3rd Viscount Baltinglass, continued hostilities to the English administration. A large English force under the Lord Deputy of Ireland Earl Grey de Wilton was sent to subdue them, only to be ambushed and defeated at the battle of Glenmalure on 25 August 1580, losing over 800 dead. Fiach also helped in the escape of Hugh Roe O'Donnell from Dublin Castle in 1591 and Hugh Roe stayed with O'Byrne at Ballinacor, Glenmalure.

In 1595, Ballinacor was occupied by a Tudor garrison, with Fiach later expelling the garrison, and destroying the fort. Fiach was betrayed and killed by the forces of the Lord Deputy of Ireland at Fananerin on 8 May 1597. He was drawn and quartered and his head was sent to Dublin Castle and placed on a spike. The head was later pickled and sent to England.

The Leabhar Branach, a book of Irish-language poetry in praise of the clan, was compiled in the early 17th century.

Felim McFiach O'Byrne, Fiach's son, was confirmed in his father's lands by patent of Queen Elizabeth after submitting to her authority, however these were lost under patent of King James I. He held the office of Member of Parliament (M.P.) for County Wicklow in 1613 and died in 1630.

The O'Byrnes have long been close to their kinsmen the O'Toole family.

Heraldry
Arms: Gules a chevron between three dexter hands couped at the wrist Argent.
Crest: A mermaid with comb and mirror proper.
Motto: Latin:certavi et vici (I have fought and I conquered).

See also
O'Byrne (surname)
Byrne
Byrn

References

Further reading

External links
The O'Byrnes and the Shiring of Wicklow at Wicklow County Council
Clann O'Byrne: The Official Webpage at Clann O'Byrne
The O'Byrne Files at My Genealogy

Ancient Irish dynasties
Irish families
Gaels